Carlos Deon Rogers (born February 6, 1971) is an American former professional basketball player who was selected by the Seattle SuperSonics in the 1st round (11th overall) of the 1994 NBA Draft.

Biography
Rogers was born in Detroit and graduated from Northwestern High School. A 6'11" forward-center from the University of Arkansas at Little Rock and Tennessee State University, Rogers played in eight NBA seasons from 1994 to 2002. He played for the Golden State Warriors, Toronto Raptors, Portland Trail Blazers, Houston Rockets and Indiana Pacers.

Rogers led the United States men's national basketball team with 87 points en route to a gold medal at the 1993 Summer Universiade.

In his NBA career, Rogers played in 298 games and scored a total of 2,196 points.

References

External links

NBA.com profile
Basketball-Reference.com stats

1971 births
Living people
African-American basketball players
All-American college men's basketball players
American expatriate basketball people in Canada
American men's basketball players
Basketball players from Detroit
Golden State Warriors players
Houston Rockets players
Indiana Pacers players
Little Rock Trojans men's basketball players
Medalists at the 1993 Summer Universiade
Portland Trail Blazers players
Power forwards (basketball)
Seattle SuperSonics draft picks
Small forwards
Northwestern High School (Michigan) alumni
Tennessee State Tigers basketball players
Toronto Raptors players
Universiade gold medalists for the United States
Universiade medalists in basketball
21st-century African-American sportspeople
20th-century African-American sportspeople